This is a list of schools in Kelantan, Malaysia. It is categorised according to the variants of schools in Malaysia, and is arranged alphabetically.

Private schools

Chinese Independent High School
 Chung Hwa Independent High School

Maahad Tahfiz
 Maahad Al-Quran Dan Bahasa Arab Al-Manar
 Maahad Tahfiz Al Hashimi

International schools
 Kelantan International School
 Wadi Sofia International School

Islamic religious schools

Secondary education: Sekolah Menengah Kebangsaan Agama (SMKA)
 SMK Agama Falahiah
 SMK Agama Melor
 SMK Agama Naim Lilbanat
 SMK Agama Wataniah
 SMK Agama Lati
 SMK Agama Tok Bachok
 SMA Tengku Amalin A'ishah Putri

Kelantan Islamic foundation (YIK) secondary education
 Mahaad Muhammadi Rantau Panjang
 Maahad Muhammadi Lelaki
 Maahad Muhammadi perempuan
 Maahad Pengajian Islam
 Maahad Muhammadi Gua Musang
 Maahad Muhammadi Tumpat
 Maahad Muhammadi Pasir Mas
 Maahad Saniah Pasir Puteh
 Maahad Syamsul Maarif (L) 
 SMU(A) Tarbiah Diniah Tahfiz Bunut Sarang Burung
 Maahad Tahfiz Sains Bustanul Ariffin

National schools

Primary education: Sekolah Kebangsaan (SK)
 SK Badak
 SK Banggol Guchil
 SK Batu Gajah, Tanah Merah
 SK Bendang Pauh
 SK Bendang Pa'Yong
 SK Berangan
 SK Bukit Jering
 SK Bukit Panau
 SK Bukit Tiu
 SK Chiku 07
 SK Dato' Hashim imran (1)
 SK Dato' Hashim (2)
 SK Geting

SK Gual Jedok, Tanah Merah
 SK Gual Tinggi
 SK Islah
 SK Ismail Petra
 SK Kangkong, Pasir Mas
 SK Kota Jembal
 SK Kampung keling
 SK Mulong (1)
 SK Mulong (2)
 SK Kedai Piah
 SK Kelaparan
 SK Kelar, Pasir Mas
 SK Kemumin
 SK Kolam
 SK Ladang Kerilla
 SK Lalang Pepuyu
 SK Laloh
 SK Lundang
 SK Mentuan
 SK Merbau
 SK Pengkalan Chengal
 SK Pak Badol
 SK Panji
 SK Pengkalan Chepa
 SK Kedondong, Pasir Mas
 SK Raja Bahar
 SK Rantau Panjang (1)
 SK Rantau Panjang (2)
 SK Semut Api
 SK Sri Rantau Panjang
 SK Sri Wakaf Bharu, Tumpat
 SK Seri Chempaka
 SK Sri Neting
 SK Sri Suria (1)
 SK Sri Suria (2)
 SK Pendek
 SK Pengkalan Kubor (1)
 SK Pengkalan Kubor (2)
 SK Banggol Chicha
 SK Sri Suria (3)
 SK Sultan Ibrahim (1)
 SK Sultan Ibrahim (2)
 SK Sultan Ibrahim (3)
 SK Sultan Ismail (1)
 SK Sultan Ismail (2)
 SK Sultan Ismail (3)
 SK Sultan Ismail (4)
 SK Sultan Yahya Petra 1 (SK SYP1)
 SK Sultan Yahya Petra 2 (SK SYP2)
 SK Sungai Tapang
 SK Tanah Merah (1)
 SK Tanah Merah (2)
 SK Tapang
 SK Telekong
 SK Tengku Indera Petra
 SK Seri Ketereh
 SK Sri Beban
 SK Othman Talib (1)
 SK Othman Talib (2)
 SK Seri Kota
 SK Katok
 SK Kubang Kerian (1)
 SK Kubang Kerian (2)
 SK Kubang Kerian(3)
 SK Zainab (1)
 SK Zainab (2)
 SK Jeli (1),Jeli
 SK Jeli (2)
 SK Kamil, Pasir Puteh
 SK Salor
 SK Bukit Gading
 SK Kota
 SK To'Uban, Pasir Mas
 SK Bukit Jarum, Pasir Mas
 SK Kampung Baru, Pasir Mas
 SK Kepas, Pasir Mas
 SK Banggol Petai, Pasir Mas
 SK Bukit Perah, Pasir Mas
 SK Chicha Tinggi, Pasir Mas
 SK Kok Pauh, Rantau Panjang
 SK Paloh Pintu Gang, Kota Bharu
 SK Pantai Senok, Bachok
 SK Pangkal Jenereh, Machang
 SK Teluk Jering, Tumpat
 SK Sungai Terah, Gua Musang
 SK Pos Brooke, Lojing
 SK Blau, Lojing

Secondary education: Sekolah Menengah Kebangsaan (SMK)

Chinese national-type schools (also known as Jenis Kebangsaan (C) schools)

Chinese Primary School
SJK (C) CHUNG CHENG
SJK (C) CHUNG HWA KOTA BAHRU
SJK (C) CHUNG HWA MACHANG
SJK (C) KAI CHIH
SJK (C) KHAY BOON
SJK (C) PEI HWA
SJK (C) PEIR CHIH
SJK (C) POEY SIT
SJK (C) POY HWA
SJK (C) YOK ENG
SJK (C) YUK CHAI
SJK (C) YUK CHENG
SJK (C) YUK TSE
SJK (C) GUA MUSANG
SJK (C) KAMPUNG PULAI

SMJK School
 SMJK (C) Chung Cheng, Kota Bharu
 SMJK (C) Chung Hwa, Kota Bharu

SMP School
 SMP Chung Hwa, Kok Lanas

Technical school|Technical secondary schools: Sekolah Menengah Teknik (SMT)

 SMT Bachok, Bachok
 SMT Kuala Krai, Kuala Krai
 SMT Pasir Mas
 SMT Pengkalan Chepa, Kota Bharu
 SMT Tanah Merah, Tanah Merah

MRSM and SBP
 Maktab Rendah Sains MARA Pengkalan Chepa
 Maktab Rendah Sains MARA Jeli
 Maktab Rendah Sains MARA Kuala Krai
 Maktab Rendah Sains MARA Pasir Tumboh
 Maktab Sultan Ismail - also known as Sultan Ismail College (SIC)
 SMS Tengku Muhammad Faris Petra
  Sekolah Menengah Sains Machang
 Sekolah Menengah Sains Pasir Puteh
 Sekolah Menengah Sains Jeli 
 Maktab Rendah Sains MARA Tumpat

See also
 Education in Malaysia

References

Kelantan